Dichomeris cirrhostola is a moth in the family Gelechiidae. It was described by Turner in 1919. It is found in Australia, where it has been recorded from Queensland.

The forewings are whitish-ochreous with the costal edge fuscous at the base and with some ochreous-fuscous irroration before the lower part of the termen. The hindwings are ochreous-whitish.

References

Moths described in 1919
cirrhostola